North Palos School District 117 (NPD 117) is a school district headquartered in Palos Hills, Illinois, in the Chicago metropolitan area.

It serves Palos Hills, Hickory Hills, and a section of Bridgeview.

History
It was first established as the Palos School District No. 4 around 1858. Its first school was the North Palos School. In 1900 the name changed to Cook County School District 117 as school districts became numbered according to the county instead of according to the township.

Schools
Conrady Junior High School (Hickory Hills)
Elementary schools:
Dorn Elementary School (Hickory Hills)
Glen Oaks Elementary School (Hickory Hills)
Oak Ridge Elementary School (Palos Hills)
Sorrick Elementary School (Palos Hills)

Oak Ridge Elementary
2nd - 5th

Sorrick Elementary School
PreK - 1st

References

External links
 

School districts in Cook County, Illinois
1858 establishments in Illinois
School districts established in 1858